A custom car is a passenger vehicle that has been either substantially altered to improve its performance, often by altering or replacing the engine and transmission; made into a personal "styling" statement, using paint work and aftermarket accessories to make the car look unlike any car as delivered from the factory; or some combination of both. A desire among some automotive enthusiasts in the United States is to push "styling and performance a step beyond the showroom floor - to truly craft an automobile of one's own." A custom car in British according to Collins English Dictionary is built to the buyer's own specifications.

Although the two are related, custom cars are distinct from hot rods. The extent of this difference has been the subject of debate among customizers and rodders for decades. Additionally, a street rod can be considered a custom.

Custom cars are not to be confused with coachbuilt automobiles, historically rolling chassis fitted with luxury bodywork by specialty body builders.

History

A development of hot rodding, the change in name corresponded to the change in the design of the cars being modified. The first hot rods were pre-World War II cars, with running boards and simple fenders over the wheels. Early model cars (1929 to 1934) were modified by removing the running boards and either removing the fenders entirely or replacing them with light cycle fenders. Later models usually had fender skirts installed. The "gow job" morphed into the hot rod in the early to middle 1950s. Typical of builds from before World War II were 1935 Ford wire wheels.

Many cars were "hopped up" with engine modifications such as adding additional carburetors, high compression heads, and dual exhausts. Engine swaps were often done, with the objective of placing the most powerful engine in the lightest possible frame and body combination. The suspension was usually altered, initially by lowering the rear end as much as possible using lowering blocks on the rear springs. Later cars were given a rake job by either adding a dropped front axle or heating front coil springs to make the front end of the car much lower than the rear. Immediately postwar, most rods would change from mechanical to hydraulic ("juice") brakes and from bulb to sealed-beam headlights.

The mid-1950s and early 1960s custom Deuce was typically fenderless and steeply chopped, and almost all Ford (or Mercury, with the  flatty, introduced in 1939); a Halibrand quick-change rearend was also typical, and an Edelbrock intake manifold or Harman and Collins ignition magneto would not be uncommon. Reproduction spindles, brake drums, and backing based on the 1937s remain available today. Aftermarket flatty heads were available from Barney Navarro, Vic Edelbrock, and Offenhauser. The first intake manifold Edelbrock sold was a "slingshot" design for the flatty. Front suspension hairpins were adapted from sprint cars, such as the Kurtis Krafts. The first Jimmy supercharger on a V8 may have been by Navarro in 1950.

Much later, rods and customs swapped the old solid rear axle for an independent rear, often from Jaguar. Sometimes the grille of one make of car replaced another; the 1937 Buick grille was often used on a Ford. In the 1950s and 1960s, the grille swap of choice was the 1953 DeSoto. The original hot rods were plainly painted like the Model A Fords from which they had been built up, and only slowly begun to take on colors, and eventually, fancy orange-yellow flamed hoods or "candy-like" deep acrylic finishes in the various colors.

With the change in automobile design to encase the wheels in fenders and to extend the hood to the full width of the car, the former practices were no longer possible. In addition, tremendous automotive advertising raised public interest in the new models in the 1950s. Thus, custom cars came into existence, swapping headlamp rings, grilles, bumpers, chrome side strips, and taillights as well as frenching and tunneling head- and taillights. The bodies of the cars were changed by cutting through the sheet metal, removing bits to make the car lower, welding it back together, and adding lead to make the resulting form smooth (hence the term lead sled; Bondo has since largely replaced lead.) Chopping made the roof lower while sectioning made the body thinner from top to bottom. Channeling was cutting notches in the floorpan where the body touches the frame to lower the whole body. Fins were often added from other cars or made up from sheet steel. In the custom car culture, someone who merely changed the appearance without also substantially improving the performance was looked down upon. Juxtapoz Magazine, founded by the artist Robert Williams, has covered Kustom Kulture art.

Styles of modification 

Modified cars can be significantly different from their stock counterparts. A common factor among owners/modifiers is to emulate the visual and/or performance characteristics of established styles and design principles. These similarities may be unintentional. Some of the many different styles and visual influences to car modification are:

 Cal look: A modified classic Volkswagen intended to evoke California through the use of bright colours, trim, and accessories.
 Drag car: Cars modified for drag racing
 Drift car: Cars modified for drifting.
 Dub or donk or Hi-Riser: Characterized by extremely large wheels with low-profile tires, often with upgraded speaker setups, and sometimes custom paint, interiors and engine upgrades.
 Euro style: Stanced with one-off paint and small wheels, with shaved features to define car body lines.
 German look: A Volkswagen Type 1, Type 3, or Karmann Ghia lowered and fitted with late model Porsche mag wheels and touring car-influenced styling. Heavily modified suspension and drivetrain with emphasis on handling and cornering.
 Hot rod: Style largely consisting of period-specific vehicles, components, and finishes to reproduce characteristics of early drag cars from the 1930s and 1940s.
 Import or JDM: tuned Japanese vehicles.
 Itasha: cars decorated with images of characters from anime, manga, or video games
 Kaido Racer: Japanese style of cars typically with lowered suspension, bright paintjobs, extreme bodykits and extended exhausts, sometimes inspired by Japanese Group 5 "Super Silhouette" racecars. Commonly associated with the Bōsōzoku.
 Kustom: Style largely consisting of American cars built from the 1930s to 1960s customized in the styles of that period.
 Lowrider: Hydraulic or airbag suspension setups, custom paint, pinstriping, custom interior, and, typically, small diameter wire wheels. Others may look like straight restorations, aside from a low stance.
 Military/service style: Cars designed to look like certain service vehicles.
 Outlaw: Typically Porsches 356, 911 and Karmann Ghias modified with more powerful engines and brakes, and a more aggressive appearance. This movement took place in Southern California in 1960s.
 Rally car: Cars built to compete in rallies.
 Rat rod: Style of hot rod and custom cars, imitating the "unfinished" appearance of some hot rods in the 1940s, 1950s, and 1960s. "Rat style" also defines a car that is kept on the road despite visible heavy wear.
 Restomod: Classic cars that combine original exterior styling with modern applied technologies (such as new suspension, wheels, transmission) or modern interior features (multimedia etc.) for comfortable everyday use.
 Siren kings: A New Zealand Pasifika subculture where cars or bicycles are modified with loudspeakers or public address systems for use in competitive battles.
 South London look: Subtly modified 50's-70's British Fords that are lowered, with pastel paint and 13 inch Lotus Cortina steel wheels or RS, Minilite, or Revolution mag wheels. These cars often use a tuned Ford Kent or Pinto engine.
 Slab: Originated in the Houston area since the mid-1980s—usually, a full-size American luxury car is fitted with custom "elbows", a type of extended wire wheels which protrude out from the fenders, loud speaker setups, and neon signage inside the trunk panel. Other "slab" modifications include hydraulic-actuated trunk panels (a "pop trunk"), candy paint, vertical stainless steel trim on the trunk panel (known as "belt buckles"), aftermarket grille, and the use of a Cadillac front-end sheet metal conversion. The interiors of slabs are usually clad in beige or tan (in what is called a "peanut butter interior"). Usually associated with Houston hip hop music.
 Sleeper: Stock-looking cars with performance upgrades.
 Stanced: This style is mostly associated with sports and passenger cars with lowered suspension setups. Custom wheels with low-profile tires play a large role in this style and often feature aggressive sizes, offsets, and camber.
 VIP style: A Japanese style of customizing luxury cars.

Features

Paint

Paint was an important concern. Once bodywork was done, the cars were painted unusual colors. Transparent but wildly colored candy-apple paint, applied atop a metallic undercoat, and metalflake paint, with aluminum glitter within candy-apple paint, appeared in the 1960s. These took many coats to produce a brilliant effect – which in hot climates had a tendency to flake off. This process and style of paint job were invented by Joe Bailon, a customizer from Northern California.

Customizers also continued the habit of adding decorative paint after the main coat was finished, of flames extending rearward from the front wheels, scallops, and hand-painted pinstripes of a contrasting color. The base color, most often a single coat, would be expected to be of a simpler paint. Flame jobs later spread to the hood, encompassing the entire front end, and have progressed from traditional reds and yellows to blues and greens and body-color "ghost" flames. One particular style of flames, called "crab claw flames", which is still prevalent today, is attributed to Dean Jeffries.

Painting has become such a part of the custom car scene that now in many custom car competitions, awards for custom paint are as highly sought after as awards for the cars themselves.

Engine swaps

Engine swaps have always been commonplace. Once, the Ford flathead V8 engine was the preference, supplanted by the early hemi in the 1950s and 1960s. By the 1970s, the small-block Chevy was the most common option, and since the 1980s, the  Chevy has been almost ubiquitous. The  Chevrolet LS has begun replacing the 350. Flatheads and early hemis have not entirely disappeared, but ready availability, ease of maintenance, and low cost of parts make the Chevrolet V8, in particular the first and third generation small block, the most frequent engine of choice.

Once customizing post-war cars caught on, some of the practices were extended to pre-war cars, which would have been called fendered rods, with more body work done on them. An alternate rule for disambiguation developed: hot rods had the engine behind the front suspension, while customs had the engine over the front suspension. The clearest example of this is Fords prior to 1949 had Henry Ford's old transverse front suspension, while 1949 models had a more modern suspension with the engine moved forward. However, an American museum has what could be the first true custom, built by Cletus Clobes in 1932, among its exhibits. With the coming of the muscle car, and further to the high-performance luxury car, customization declined. One place where it persisted was the U.S. Southwest, where lowriders were built similar in concept to the earlier customs, but of post-1950s cars.

As the supply of usable antique steel bodies has decreased, companies such Westcott's, Harwood, Gibbon Fiberglass and Speedway Motors have begun to fabricate new fiberglass copies, while Classic Manufacturing and Supply, for one example, has been making a variety of new steel bodies since the 1970s. California's "junker" (or "crusher") law, which pays a nominal sum to take "gross polluters" off the road, has been criticized by enthusiasts (and by SEMA) for accelerating this trend. Starting in the 1950s, it became popular among customizers to display their vehicles at drive-in restaurants, such as Johnie's Broiler in Downey, California. The practice continues in Southern California.

Customizers
Examples of notable customizers include George Barris, Vini Bergeman, Bill Cushenbery, the Alexander Brothers, Bo Huff, Gil Ayala, Darryl Starbird, Roy Brizio, Troy Trepanier (of Rad Rides by Troy), Boyd Coddington, Darryl Hollenbeck (working out of at Vintage Color Studios; winner of the 2016 America's Most Beautiful Roadster (AMBR) trophy with a custom Deuce) Harry Westergaard, Dave Stuckey, Dean Jeffries, Barry Lobeck, Phil Cool (who won the 1978 AMBR trophy with a bright orange Deuce, cover car for the July 1978 issue of Hot Rod), Troy Ladd of Hollywood Hot Rods, Doane Spencer (builder of a 1940s Deuce considered the template for the hiboy), "Posie", Ron Clark and Bob Kaiser (of Clarkaiser Customs), Joe Bailon (inventor of candy apple paint), Gene Winfield, Rick Dore Joe Wilhelm, "Magoo", Chip Foose, and Pete Chapouris.

Others, such as Von Dutch, are best known as custom painters. Several customizers have become famous beyond the automobile community, including Barris, Jeffries, and Coddington, thanks to their proximity to Hollywood; Barris designed TV's Batmobile, while Chapouris built the flamed '34 three-window coupé in the eponymous telefilm "The California Kid". Another Barris creation, Ala Kart (a '29 Ford Model A roadster pickup), made numerous appearances in film (usually in the background of diner scenes and such), after taking two AMBR wins in a row. Some customizers have become well-enough known to be referred to by a given name alone. These include Boyd (Coddington), Pete (Chapouris), and Jake (Jim Jacobs).

Awards
The highest award for customizers is the AMBR (America's Most Beautiful Roadster) trophy, presented annually at the Grand National Roadster Show since 1948 (also known within the customizer community as the Oakland Roadster Show until it was moved to Southern California in 2003). This competition has produced famous, and radical, customs.

Another is the Ridler Award, presented at the Detroit Autorama since 1964 in honor of show promoter Don Ridler. With one of the most unusual car show entry requirements, winners of the prestigious Ridler Award are selected as the most outstanding among cars being shown for the first time. This prompts builders of many high-end roadsters to first enter the Autorama first and then the Grand National show in order to have the chance to win top honors at both shows. Few cars and owners can claim this achievement.

Notable customs

Some customs gained attention for winning the AMBR trophy, or for their outlandish styling. Notable among these is Silhouette and Ed Roth's Mysterion. Some of these more unusual projects turned into Hot Wheels cars, among them The Red Baron.

Other custom cars became notable for appearances in film (such as Ala Kart {1958}, The California Kid three-window {1973}, or the yellow deuce from "American Graffiti" {1973}) or television (such as The Monkeemobile, the "Munsters" hearse, or, more recently, Boyd's full-custom Tool Time '34, or Don Thelan's '33 three-window, Eliminator, built for the ZZ Top video). Specialist vehicles, such as the T/A, KITT, from Knight Rider, are not usually considered customs, but movie or TV cars, because they retain a mostly stock exterior.

Still, others exemplified a trend. One of these is the 1951 Merc built by the Barris brothers for Bob Hirohata in 1953, known forever after as the Hirohata Merc. Even without an appearance in the film ("Runnin' Wild"), it is iconic of 1950s customs, and of how to do a Merc right. The same year, Neil Emory and Clayton Jensen of Valley Custom Shop built Polynesian for Jack Stewart, starting with a 1950 Holiday 88 sedan. Polynesian made the cover of Hot Rod in August, and saw 54 pages of construction details in Motor Trend Custom Car Annual in 1954.

Language

Certain linguistic conventions are followed among rodders and customizers:
 The model year is rarely given in full, except when it might be confused, so a 1934 model is a '34, while a 2005 might be an '05 or not.
 A '32 is usually a Deuce and most often a roadster, unless coupé is specified, and almost always a Ford, now commonly on A frame rails.
 A 1955, 1956, or 1957 is usually a Chevrolet.
 A 1955, 1956, or 1957 Chevrolet is often called a Tri-Five.
 A 3- or 5-window is usually a Ford, unless specified.
 A flatty is a flathead V8 (always Ford, unless specified); a late (or late model) flatty is probably a Merc.
 A hemi ("hem ee") is always a 426, unless displacement (331, 354, or 392) is specified; a 426 is a hemi, unless Wedge is specified. See baby hemi.
 A 392 is an early hemi.
 A 331 or 354 is known to be an (early) hemi, but rarely referred to as such
 A 270 "Jimmy" was a 270 cubic inch GMC straight-6 engine often used to replace a smaller displacement Chevrolet six-cylinder.
 Units are routinely dropped, unless they are unclear, so a 426 cubic inch (in3) displacement engine is simply referred to as a 426, a 5-liter displacement engine is a 5.0 ("five point oh"), and a 600 cubic feet per minute (cfm) carburetor is a 600. Engine displacement can be described in cubic inches or liters (for example, a 5.7-liter engine is also known as a 350 {"three fifty"}); this frequently depends on which units the user is most comfortable or familiar with.
The "cutoff year" as originally promoted by the National Street Rod Association (NSRA) is 1949. Many custom car shows will only accept 1948 and earlier models as entries, and many custom car organizations will not admit later model cars or trucks (also with some imports – this has been a gray area of what's acceptable e.g. an air-cooled VW Beetle, a Big Three product manufactured overseas e.g. a Ford Capri built in the UK or a General Motors – Holden's product, not to mention captives), and/or a vintage import automobile with an American driveline transplant but this practice is subject to change. Modern-day custom car shows which allow the inclusion of muscle cars have used the 1972 model year as the cutoff since it is considered the end of the muscle car era prior to the introduction of the catalytic converter. The NSRA has announced that starting in 2011 it will switch to a shifting year method where any owner with a car 30 years or older will be allowed membership. So in 2011, the owner of a 1981 model year vehicle will qualify, then in 2012 the owner of a 1982 model year vehicle will quality, and so on. Additionally, the Goodguys car show organization has moved the year limit for its "rod" shows from 1949 to 1954 in recent years.

Common terms

Some other common terms:
 3 deuces – arrangement of three 2-barrel (twin-choke) carburetors; distinct from Six Pak, Pontiac and Olds Tri-Power (also 3x2 arrangements)
 3-window – 2-door coupé; so named for having rear window and one door window on each side
 5-window – 2-door coupé; so named for having rear window plus one door window and one quarter window on each side
 97s  – Stromberg carburetors
 A-bone – Model A coupé
 Appletons (sometimes Appleton spots) – spotlights, mounted on the A-pillars, similar to those used by police cars
 Ardun –  hemi heads for the flathead, designed by Zora ARkus-DUNtov
 Baby moons – chrome small smooth convex hubcaps covering the wheel lug area. Full moons covered the entire wheel.
 Barn find – newly discovered vehicle typically found in storage, either long forgotten or abandoned, still in its original condition from when it was first stored
 Big'n'littles – large-diameter rear wheels (or tires), smaller–diameter front ones
 Blue dots
 Pontiac tail lights
 Any taillight equipped with a blue crystal to give it a "purple-ish" appearance when illuminated. Illegal in many states.
 Bondo – brand name for a body filler putty, often used as a generic term for any such product
 Bugcatcher intake – large scoop intake protruding through hood opening, or on cars with no hood.
 Bullnosing – replacing the hood ornament with a "bullnose" chrome strip or filling the mounting hole with lead.
 Cabriolet (or cabrio) – vehicle with a removable or retractable cloth top, characterized by integrated door window frames and crank-up glass.
 Channeled or channeling – lowering a vehicle by cutting out the floor and mounting the body lower on the frame rails
 Chopped – removing a section, usually of the window posts, to lower the roofline of a vehicle.
 Cobra killers – decorative wheel centers that stick out  and have flipper qualities for more visual attraction.
 Convertible – retractable top car with no integral door window frames like the cabriolet. Has roll-up glass in doors as opposed to roadsters that do not.
 Cutouts – stub exhaust pipes installed behind the front wheels that allow uncapping for noise and power. In the 1950s were homemade from gas tank filler necks with gas caps and water pipes with screw-on caps.
 Dagmars – large front bumper "bullets"  (named for the actress
 Deck – to remove trunklid handle and trim
 Decked – trunklid handle and trim removed
 Deuce
 '32 Ford (most often a roadster); now commonly on A frame rails
 rarely, the 1932 model of any manufacturer.
 Chevy II Nova
 DuVall windshield – a v-shaped windshield with a center post, as opposed to the typical stock straight-across type
 Elephant – Chrysler 426 Hemi (see baby hemi)
 Fat-fender – 1934–48 (U.S.) car
 Flatty – flathead engine (usually refers to a Ford; when specified, the Mercury–built model)
 Fordillac ("for di lack") – Ford with transplanted Cadillac V8 engine
 Frenched
 Antenna sunken into the body or fender
 Headlight slightly sunken into fender
 Tail lights slightly sunken into body or fender
 Hairpins – radius rods
 Hiboy (or highboy) – fenderless, but not lowered Distinct from gasser.
 Hopped up – modified to increase performance
 Humpback (or hump) –late 1930s sedans with a prominent trunk
 Jimmy
 (usually) GMC straight-6 engine
 any GMC product, such as a compressor used on two-stroke diesel engines used as a supercharger.
 Jugs – multiple carburetors (no longer common)
 Juice brakes – hydraulic brakes
 Lead sled – a customized vehicle where lead has been melted and adhered to a metal body to smooth its surface, as filler. (Lead has since been replaced by Bondo.)
 Lakes pipes – straight exhaust pipes that run along the lower edge of a rod, typically near the rocker panels, without mufflers. The name comes from their original use on cars used on dry lakes by land speed racers.
 Loboy (or low boy, lowboy) – fenderless and lowered
 Mag
 magnesium wheel, or steel or aluminum copy resembling one such
 magneto
 Mill – any internal combustion engine on such a vehicle
 Moons (or Moon discs; incorrectly, moon discs) – plain flat chrome or aluminum hubcaps, originally adopted by land speed racers. Smaller examples are "baby moons". Named for Dean Moon.
 Mouse – small-block Chevy
 Nailhead – Early Buick V8, named for relatively small diameter valves
 Nerf bars – bumper horns
 NOS – New Old Stock: original-manufactured part, never installed, often in original packaging.
 Nosed – hood trim removed
 Phaeton – 4 dr roadster; also called a touring
 Phantom – body style or trim never built by the original manufacturer (a term also adopted by model kit builders)
 Pinched rails – Deuce frame rails narrowed under a Model A (which has a narrower front body)
 Pot – carburetor (commonly used for two-barrels)
 QJ – Quadrajet (Rochester 4-barrel)
 Q–jet – Quadrajet
 Ragtop – convertible or roadster
 Rake job – car with suspension modified to lower the front end
 Rat –Chevrolet Big–block
 Repop – reproduction (not NOS)
 Resto – restoration, or restored
 Roadster – two-door with removable or retracting top, and no roll-up side glass
 Rockcrusher – Muncie M22 4-speed transmission
 Rocket – Oldsmobile, in particular, their early V8s. A reference to the marque's logo.
 Sabrinas (Britain) – bumper bullets, similar to Dagmars. Named for British actress Norma Sykes ("Sabrina")
 SBC – Chevrolet small-block engine
 SBF – Small-block Ford, usually one of the Ford Windsor engines
 Sectioning – removing an entire horizontal section of the body or top to bottom. Not to be confused with "chopping".
 Shaved – Removing at least the door handle, possibly other side trim.
 Shoebox – '49–'54 Ford or 1955–57 Chevrolet (for the slab-sided appearance)
 Skirts – Covers installed on the openings on rear fenders
 Slantback – sedan with forward–angled but straight rear window and sheetmetal. Also referred to as slick back, slicky, smoothback, smoothy. Distinct from straightback. Also see humpback.
 Smoothies – chrome steel wheels with no brake vent holes. Usually with baby moons or spiders.
 Sombreros – '47–'51 Cadillac hubcaps
 Souped (souped up) – hopped up, performance improved (more common in the 1940s and 1950s)
 Spiders – decorative chrome insert covering the bearing grease cover and lugs nuts.
 Spinner knob – egg-sized knob mounted on the steering wheel to assist rapid turning; also "suicide knob"
 Steelies – steel rims
 Stock – original equipment
 Bone stock – all-original (usually referring to a project's starting condition); unmodified ("'53 Merc with a stone stock 350").
 Stovebolt – Chevrolet Stovebolt engine
 Straightback – sedan with vertical rear window and sheetmetal. (Known as squareback in the VW community.)
 Street rod – A modified car licensed for use on streets and highways. 
 Studillac ("stewed i lack") – Studebaker with transplanted Cadillac V8 engine
 Taildragger – lowered more in the rear than the front. Often seen on leadsleds. Often a regionalized trend.
 Tin Indian – Pontiac (for the grille badge)
 Tire Lettering – A tire modification that allows you to put letters and writing or colors like red, yellow, or blue in the place of the white strip on traditional Whitewall tires.
 Toploader – Ford 4-speed manual transmission
 Touring – phaeton
 Track T – Model T roadster built in the style of a dirt track race car
 Trailer queen – a pejorative term for pure show cars which are never driven
 Tri-Five – 1955, 1956, or 1957 Chevrolet
 Tuck-and-roll – upholstery technique creating a "pleated" look
 Tunneled – deeply sunken into fender
 V-butted (or vee-butted) – with windshield center post deleted, original panes meeting in the middle (distinct from fitting a one-piece windshield), or to make such a change ("the windshield was vee-butted", "he vee-butted the windshield")
 Vicky – Victoria body style
 Wide whites – wide-stripe whitewall tires, typical of the 1950s, as opposed to modern ones.
 Woodie – Typically a station wagon manufactured by most of the major manufacturers where much of the body behind the firewall was replaced with wood construction.
Some terms have an additional, different meaning among hot rodders than among customizers: NOS, for instance, is a reference to nitrous oxide, rather than new old stock.

Gallery

See also

 Adapted automobile
 Automotive restoration
 Car tuning
 Crate engine
 Custom motorcycle
 Electric vehicle conversion
 Hot hatch
 Hot rod
 Import scene
 Kustom
 Lead sled
 Lowrider
 Pimp My Ride
 Rat rod
 Rice burner
 scanger
 Sleeper (car)
 Street racing
 Tuner
 Virtual tuning
 Volksrod

References

External links

Modified vehicles
Automotive technologies
DIY culture
Automotive styling features
Visual arts media